Dee Martin Decker (born June 7, 1957) is a former Major League Baseball pitcher who appeared in four games for the San Diego Padres in . He batted and threw right-handed.

Early life
Decker was born in Upland, California. He attended Placer High School in Auburn, California and later Point Loma Nazarene University in San Diego.

Playing career
Decker was drafted by the Philadelphia Phillies in the 23rd round of the 1980 amateur draft. By 1983 he was playing for the Triple-A Portland Beavers. Late in the 1983 season Decker was one of the "players to be named later" (PTBNL) the Phillies sent to the San Diego Padres in exchange for Sixto Lezcano and a PTBNL from the Padres.

The Padres immediately assigned Decker to the major league club, where he appeared in four games from September 20–October 2. He spent the next two seasons with the Triple-A Las Vegas Stars, and left American professional baseball following the 1985 season at age 28.

External links
, or Retrosheet
Pura Pelota (Venezuelan Winter League)

1957 births
Living people
Baseball players from California
Helena Phillies players
Las Vegas Stars (baseball) players
Major League Baseball pitchers
Oklahoma City 89ers players
Peninsula Pilots players
People from Upland, California
Point Loma Nazarene Sea Lions baseball players
Portland Beavers players
San Diego Padres players
Tiburones de La Guaira players
American expatriate baseball players in Venezuela
Placer High School alumni
Alaska Goldpanners of Fairbanks players